Crib may refer to:

Bach (New Zealand), a type of modest beach house, called a crib in the southern half of the South Island e.g. Otago and Southland
Box crib, a wooden frame used to stabilise a heavy object during a rescue, jacking, construction, or moving operation
Cheat sheet or crib sheet, a concise set of notes for quick reference
Ciani Crib, a single seat, high performance glider
Corn crib, a granary for drying and storing corn
Crib (cryptanalysis), a sample of known plaintext in codebreaking
Crib barn, a popular type of barn found throughout the U.S. south and southeast regions
Crib bridge, a bridge built of logs or stones stacked like log cabins
Crib Goch, a ‘knife-edged’ arête in Gwynedd, Wales
Crib lighthouse, a type of lighthouse whose structure rests on a concrete or masonry foundation supported with wooden beams
Crib pier, a type of pier built with supporting columns constructed like log cabins
Cribbage, a card game
Cribbing (horse), a bad habit of some horses
Infant bed, called a crib in American English
Manger, a trough or box to hold food for animals
 Mid-morning break for a snack, in Cornish dialect
Nativity scene, a depiction of the birth of Jesus as described in the gospels of Matthew and Luke
Timber crib dam, a dam built with heavy timbers in the manner of a log house
Water crib, an offshore structure that supplies water to an onshore pumping station
Crib wall, a gravity type retaining wall built of precast concrete slabs

See also
Cribs (disambiguation)